MV Adolphus Busch was a cargo ship that was sunk off of Looe Key, Florida, as an artificial reef and dive site.

The ship was built as London by the Burntisland Shipbuilding Company, Fife, Scotland, for the Dundee, Perth & London Shipping Co Ltd, Dundee and was launched on 20 December 1950. She sailed under a number of names during her career before she was wrecked at Port-au-Prince on 24 September 1998 under the name Ocean Alley.

The wreck was bought by August Adolphus Busch IV and named after his great-grandfather, Adolphus Busch. He had the ship stripped out and arranged for its sinking as an artificial reef to help preserve marine habitat. The ship was sunk on 5 December 1998.

Current status
The wreck is fully penetrable, and can be entered through the bridge or cargo holds. The machinery in the engine room is still present and presents the only major entanglement hazard to divers. The glass from the wheelhouse windows and the covers to the cargo holds have been removed.

Multiple mooring balls are secured to the wreck to allow boats to tie up to the site. Reef fish are common on the site, as are large jewfish, eels, and large pelagic fish. Sharks have been seen on the reef, but are not considered typical.

References

Shipwrecks of the Florida Keys
1950 ships
Maritime incidents in 1998
Ships sunk as artificial reefs
Ships sunk as dive sites
Tourist attractions in the Florida Keys
Ships built in Scotland